Morosaglia is a commune in the Haute-Corse department, on the island of Corsica, France. Since 2015, it is the seat of the canton of Golo-Morosaglia.

History

Morosaglia is the native commune of Pasquale Paoli (1725-1807). The house in which he was born is a museum. This commune also is the historical seat of the Corsican Republic. Paoli had his chambers in the Franciscan monastery and the Corsican parliament met there.

Geography

In the plain of the river, nearly at its confluence with the Asco, on the Bastia-Ajaccio road, is the hamlet of Ponte-Leccia, where the only railway branch of the entire island is located, the branch to Calvi.

Population

See also 
 Ponte Leccia
 Communes of the Haute-Corse department
 Julien Giovannetti (1914–1966), baritone born in Morosaglia.

References

Communes of Haute-Corse
Haute-Corse communes articles needing translation from French Wikipedia